This is a list of prisons within Guizhou province of the People's Republic of China.

Sources 
 

Buildings and structures in Guizhou
Guizhou